A. T. Ramaswamy is an Indian politician and a Member of the Legislative Assembly in Karnataka. He has been elected to the Karnataka Legislative Assembly four times from the Arkalgud Vidhana Sabha constituency (1989, 1994, 2004, 2018).

References

Living people
Year of birth missing (living people)
Janata Dal (Secular) politicians
Karnataka MLAs 1989–1994
Karnataka MLAs 1994–1999
Karnataka MLAs 2004–2007
Karnataka MLAs 2018–2023
People from Hassan district
Former members of Indian National Congress
Indian National Congress politicians from Karnataka